William Abbott Moseley (October 20, 1798 – November 19, 1873) was an American physician, lawyer and politician from New York.

Life
Moseley, son of Dr. Elizur Moseley, was born in Whitesboro, New York, in 1798. He graduated from Yale College in 1816. Then he studied medicine and practiced as a physician. He studied law at home, and began practice in Buffalo, New York in 1822.

In 1834 he was drawn into political life by being elected to the New York State Assembly (Erie Co.). He was a member of the New York State Senate (8th D.) from 1838 to 1841, sitting in the 61st, 62nd, 63rd and 64th New York State Legislatures. Believing his duties as Senator (and one of the Court of Appeals) somewhat incompatible with his professional employments, he relinquished his practice, which he did not again resume.  Declining a re-election, he made an extended tour in Europe, and the week after his return (in 1842) was nominated for Congress. Moseley was elected as a Whig to the 28th and 29th United States Congresses, holding office from March 4, 1843, to March 3, 1847. Afterwards he resumed the practice of law.

He spent the rest his life in Buffalo and abroad, and died at the Fifth Avenue Hotel, New York City, November 19, 1873. He was buried at the Forest Lawn Cemetery, Buffalo.

He was twice married.

Sources

1798 births
1873 deaths
Yale College alumni
New York (state) state senators
Burials at Forest Lawn Cemetery (Buffalo)
People from Whitesboro, New York
Politicians from Buffalo, New York
Whig Party members of the United States House of Representatives from New York (state)
19th-century American politicians
Lawyers from Buffalo, New York
Physicians from Buffalo, New York
19th-century American lawyers